Richard Want (fl. 1692–1696) was a pirate active in the Indian Ocean. He is best known for sailing alongside Thomas Tew and Henry Avery.

History

Thomas Tew's first voyage from Rhode Island, around the Cape of Good Hope, and into the Indian Ocean to plunder Moorish ships using Madagascar as a staging base was wildly successful. Want had been Tew's first mate aboard the Amity for that 1692 cruise. Want had previously been a buccaneer, serving with George Raynor aboard the Batchelor's Delight when Raynor returned to Charles Town in the Province of South Carolina. Like Raynor, Want had married and settled down in South Carolina but had roots in New England.

Tew's crew convinced him to go back for a second cruise to try repeating his prior success. This time Want took command of his own 6-gun 60-man Spanish brigantine named Dolphin, fitted out in Philadelphia, and he obtained a privateering commission from the governor to cover his activities. In 1694 Tew and Want sailed out alongside another Providence companion, Joseph Faro in the Portsmouth Adventure.

Once the group arrived near Mocha in 1695, they were joined by Thomas Wake and William May, where they also met Henry Every. They waited for the Mughal Empire's treasure-laden convoy to pass; most of the Mughal ships slipped by in the night but the pirates caught two stragglers. Tew's Amity sailed ahead to attack the smaller Fateh Mohammed but a cannon shot killed Tew early in the battle. Once the others defeated and looted Fateh Mohammed, they turned on the larger Gunsway, a personal treasure ship of Emperor Aurangzeb. Tew's Amity under ship's master John Ireland sailed back to Adam Baldridge's pirate trading post near Madagascar. Wake's Susannah was too slow and missed the battle. Want's Dolphin proved slow and unseaworthy - "an ill sayler" - and was abandoned. Every took its crew aboard his ship Fancy and burned the empty Dolphin. Faro and Every caught the Gunsway, with May's Pearl in tow, though Faro never engaged them. Want's crew served alongside Every's during the battle and received the same shares of Gunsway's immense treasure.

Want remained aboard Every's Fancy, making his way through the Persian Gulf then back to South Carolina via the Bahamas. Records indicate he had another privateering commission in 1696, this time from South Carolina.

See also

Pirate Round – later name for the route Tew and others took from New England, around southern Africa, and into the Indian Ocean via Madagascar

Notes

References

Year of birth missing
Year of death missing
American pirates
17th-century pirates
South Carolina colonial people
Piracy in the Indian Ocean